Joseph Aloysius "Red" Dunn (June 21, 1901 – January 15, 1957) was a professional American football player who played running back and was an exceptional punter for eight seasons for the Milwaukee Badgers, Chicago Cardinals, and Green Bay Packers.  He was inducted into the Green Bay Packers Hall of Fame in 1976. He is the grandfather of former quarterback Jason Gesser.

Nicknamed "Red" for the color of his hair, Dunn possessed an equally colorful personality. He earned five letters competing in football, basketball and baseball at Marquette Academy. Dunn later attended Marquette University, earning All-America honors while leading the Golden Avalanche in 1922 and 1923 to a 17–0–1 record. While a Packer, he served as Curly Lambeau's "field general" for the 1929, 1930, and 1931 NFL Champions.

After this playing days Dunn moved to coaching, assisting Frank Murray and Paddy Driscoll at Marquette from 1932 to 1940. Dunn is a member of the Green Bay Packers Hall of Fame and the Wisconsin Athletic Hall of Fame.

References

1901 births
1957 deaths
American football quarterbacks
Chicago Cardinals players
Green Bay Packers players
Milwaukee Badgers players
Marquette Golden Avalanche football coaches
Marquette Golden Avalanche football players
Sportspeople from Milwaukee
Players of American football from Milwaukee